Dr Charles Harry Moody Hon. FRCO (22 March 1874 - 10 May 1965) was a composer and organist based in England.

Life

He was born in Stourbridge, Worcestershire on 22 March 1874, the son of Charles Moody (1825 – 1893) and Lydia Glover (1829-1904)

He studied organ under T. Westlake Morgan at Bangor Cathedral.

He married Mary Grindall Brayton in 1899 in Wigan. The marriage produced:
Barbara Gunhilda Moody (b. 1899)
Brian Elgar Moody (b. 1902)
Brenda Moody (b. 1913)

He was appointed CBE and Hon FRCO in 1920.

He was also a lecturer in music at the Diocesan Training College in Ripon from 1902 - 1952.

Appointments

Organist of St. Michael's College, Tenbury 
Assistant organist of Wells Cathedral 1894 - 1895
Organist at All Saints' Church, Wigan 1895 - 1899
Organist at Holy Trinity Church, Coventry 1899 - 1902
Organist at Ripon Cathedral 1902 - 1954
Conductor of the Halifax Choral Society 1917 - 1922 (John A. Hargreaves: "Every Valley Shall be Exalted, Halifax Choral Society 1818-2018")

Works

Books
Church Music
The Choir Boy in the Making
Selby Abbey
Ripon Cathedral
Fountains Abbey

Compositions

Communion Service in B flat
Magnificat and Nunc Dimittis in D minor
Anthem: Before the ending of the day
Anthem: Except The Lord Keep The House
Hymn: O Spirit Of Our God

References

1874 births
1965 deaths
English organists
British male organists
English composers
People from Stourbridge